Ban Nong Tat station is a railway station located in Nong Tat Subdistrict, Mueang Buriram District, Buriram Province.

References 

Railway stations in Thailand
Buriram province